George Lane (6 March 1856 – 24 September 1925) was an American-born Canadian politician and rancher and known as one of the Big Four who helped found the Calgary Stampede in 1912. In 2016, he was inducted into the Hall of Great Westerners of the National Cowboy & Western Heritage Museum.

George was foreman at the Bar U Ranch and eventually returned in the early 1900s to purchase it for $250,000.  In 1885 he married Elizabeth Sexsmith and they raised 8 children together.

In the 1913 Alberta general election George was elected as the first member for the Bow Valley riding for the Alberta Liberal Party. He was somewhat of a star candidate for the Liberal Party, and helped keep a critical southern Alberta seat from going Conservative.  He defeated Conservative Incumbent Harold Riley who had changed from the Gleichen district.  George would spend very little time as a member of the Legislative Assembly of Alberta, he would resign a short time later so that defeated Cabinet Minister Charles R. Mitchell could re-gain a seat in the legislature.

Legacy
 Hall of Great Westerners, 2016

Election results

References

External links
George Lane and his home in Calgary

Alberta Liberal Party MLAs
American expatriates in Canada
1856 births
1925 deaths
Canadian cattlemen
Persons of National Historic Significance (Canada)